Whiskey Business is a 2012 American made-for-television comedy film directed by Robert Iscove and written by Jed Elinoff and Scott Thomas. The film stars Pauly Shore, Cynthia Preston, John Schneider, Tanya Tucker, Brad Borbridge and Ari Cohen. The film premiered on CMT on March 25, 2012.

Plot
The son of a New Jersey mob boss is framed for a murder he didn't commit. He goes on the run and ends up in Tennessee where he bonds with the residents of a small town.

Cast
Pauly Shore as Nicky Ferelli
Cynthia Preston as Jess
John Schneider as Sheriff Gilly
Tanya Tucker as Trina
Brad Borbridge as Parnell
Ari Cohen as Dino
Nick Mancuso as Don Farelli
Cedric Smith as Jack
Daniel DeSanto as Joey Pipes
Reid Janisse as Deputy
Kayla Lorette as Denise
Aurora Browne as Charmaine

References

External links
 

2012 films
2012 comedy films
2012 television films
CMT (American TV channel) original programming
American comedy television films
2010s English-language films
Films directed by Robert Iscove
Films set in Tennessee
2010s American films